Lermond is a surname. Notable people with the surname include:

 George Lermond (1904–1940), American long-distance runner
 Leo Lermond (1906–1986), American long-distance runner
 Norman Wallace Lermond (1861–1944), American naturalist and socialist activist